The 1998 New York Jets season was the 39th season for the team and the 29th in the National Football League (NFL). The team improved on its previous season by three games, finishing 12–4 in their second season under head coach Bill Parcells and their first playoff appearance since 1991, winning their first division title since the AFL-NFL merger in 1970; the 12–4 record was also the best in Jets history. This success came just two years after the Jets’ 1–15 record in 1996.

The Jets earned a first-round bye, given to the two division winners with the best records, for the first time. They defeated the Jacksonville Jaguars in the Divisional round of the playoffs. Their attempt to reach their first Super Bowl in thirty years was halted by losing in Denver when the 14–2 Broncos scored 23 unanswered points in the second half. 

The 1998 Jets are one of only two teams in NFL history to win seven games against teams that would go on to make the playoffs.

Vinny Testaverde threw for 3,256 yards, 29 touchdowns, and only 7 interceptions in 421 pass attempts (1.7%).

The title game was the Jets’ last title game appearance until 2009, although they returned to the playoffs in 2001, and qualified for the postseason four more times that decade.

Offseason
In the offseason, the Jets signed New England Patriots running back Curtis Martin to an offer sheet. The Patriots had offered Martin, their star running back, a tender deal that would net them a first-round pick and a third-round pick if a team signed him. Jets coach and general manager Bill Parcells, who had left New England two years prior and still harbored some bad blood with the team, offered Martin a very large contract that the Patriots were unwilling to match, further fueling the rivalry between the teams.

In addition, the Jets parted ways with veteran quarterback Neil O'Donnell after two seasons and signed another veteran, Vinny Testaverde, to serve as backup to Glenn Foley. Testaverde eventually succeeded Foley as the starter and led the Jets to their division title. On defense, New York added former Miami Dolphins linebacker Bryan Cox.

The offseason also saw the first major overhaul of the Jets' uniforms and logos since 1978. The team changed its primary color from kelly green to hunter green, eliminated black which had been added in 1990 as a trim color, and abandoned the solid green helmets with the modern “JETS” wordmark in favor of white helmets with two green parallel stripes down the center, as worn from 1965-77, but with a green facemask. The new primary/helmet logo resembles the 1965-77 version but is oval rather than football-shaped and has a somewhat “cleaner” appearance, with starker lines defining the word “JETS” in thick sans-serif italics in front of the “NY” in serif outline lettering, and the miniature football at bottom center. This logo was also added to the jersey front, by the player’s left shoulder. The jerseys and pants also resemble the 1963-77 uniforms, with alternating shoulder stripes, opposite-colored sleeves and TV numerals, and two green parallel stripes from hip to knee on each side.

NFL draft

Roster

Regular season

Schedule

Standings

Season summary

Week 1 at 49ers

Week 11 at Colts

Playoffs

Playoff Game Summaries

AFC Divisional Playoffs vs. Jacksonville Jaguars

AFC Championship Game vs. Denver Broncos

Notes

References

External links
1998 team stats
1998 New York Jets video

AFC East championship seasons
New York Jets seasons
New York Jets
New York Jets season
20th century in East Rutherford, New Jersey
Meadowlands Sports Complex